John McKinnon may refer to:
John McKinnon (diplomat) (born 1950), New Zealand diplomat and public servant
John McKinnon (Nova Scotia politician, born 1832) (1832–1907), Nova Scotia politician
John McKinnon (Nova Scotia politician, born 1808) (1808–1892), political figure in Nova Scotia
John J. McKinnon (1847–1884), his son, Nova Scotia politician
John Kenneth McKinnon (1936–2019), Canadian politician
Johnny McKinnon (1902–1969), Canadian ice hockey player
John McKinnon (ophthalmologist) (born 1939), New Zealand mountaineer and Kunde Hospital volunteer

See also
Jon MacKinnon (born 1977), field hockey goalkeeper